Decalactone may refer to:

 δ-Decalactone (DDL)
 γ-Decalactone